Sada Mire (born July 1976) (Somali: Sacda Mire, Arabic: سعدة ميرة‎) is a Swedish-Somali archaeologist, art historian and presenter who currently serves as assistant professor at the faculty of archeology, Leiden University. she is from Arap clan She is a public intellectual and heritage activist who has argued that cultural heritage is a basic human need in her 2014 TEDxEuston talk. In 2017, Hay Festival of Literature and the Arts selected Mire as one of their 30 international thinkers and writers. She became the Director of Antiquities pf Somaliland in 2007. Raised in the Somali capital of Mogadishu, Mire fled the country at the start of the civil war at the age of 15. She then traveled to Sweden seeking asylum. She has since returned to the Horn of Africa as an archaeologist.

Early life and education
Sada Mire was born in Hargeisa, Somaliland, in 1977 before relocating to Mogadishu with her family. Her father was as a police official who died during the early stages of the collapse of the Somali state when she was 12. After this traumatic experience, in 1991, she fled Somalia with her mother and siblings on a relative's lorry during the Somali Civil War. Mire and her identical twin, Sohur, emigrated to Sweden where an older sister lived and received asylum. The twins later moved to the United Kingdom to study. Mire studied Scandinavian pre-history and archaeozoology at Lund University in Sweden before receiving a BA degree in History of Art/Archaeology of Africa and Asia at SOAS, University of London in 2005, and subsequently an MA in African Archaeology in 2006 and PhD degree in Archaeology in 2009 at University College London.

Career
She has conducted field research in Somaliland, the United Kingdom, Denmark, Sweden, Ethiopia, Kenya, Djibouti and Egypt, and has worked for the United Nations Development Program. A TED-speaker, she has participated on the editorial boards, including African Archaeological Review.

Motivated to learn the history of Somaliland, her homeland which was once a colonial country in Africa, she took up a fellowship under the department of art and archaeology at the School of Oriental and African Studies in London (also head of the department of antiquities in Somaliland). She launched an ambitious programme of archeological explorations in 2007.

Mire, leading a team of 50 helpers, has discovered prehistoric rock art in Somaliland at almost 100 sites; at least 10 of these are likely to receive World Heritage status. The NGO, Horn Heritage, partially funds her work for Somali Heritage.

Education work
In order to educate her people on the cultural heritage of their country, to continue with the archaeological explorations and get UNESCO World Heritage Sites status for some of the rock art sites she has discovered, she has established the "Horn Heritage", a non-profit organization to fund her work. She was also involved in establishing Somalia’s Department of Tourism and Archaeology. Through her charity Horn Heritage and with partners, Mire initiated and implemented digital 3D and virtual reality (VR) projects for Somali heritage, so that anybody anywhere could access her rock art work. In 2006, Mire created the first website dedicated to Somali Heritage and Archeology.

Mire has run national and international media campaigns to fight the looting and destruction of Somali archeological sites. One of her direct messages to the Somali public warning against looting was broadcast by BBC Somali.
Mire's work for public access to education and heritage protection is illustrated by her MOOC (Massive online open course) on 'Heritage under Threat', launched in December 2016, to be continued until 2020. This video based course introduces the learners to the topic of heritage under threat. The course is written and presented by Mire.

Theoretical contribution to heritage and archaeology 
"Cultural heritage, including archeological knowledge, is a basic human need"  argues Mire, in her 2011 NewScientist interview article titled 'We need culture in times of war'. Her work bridges archaeology and anthropology of the Horn of Africa in investigating the pre-Islamic and pre-Christian indigenous religions and traditions of the Horn of Africa.

Mire discussed the misuse of archaeology for politics and intentional destruction of heritage sites by ideological groups for example India. For her geographical area of fieldwork, she has argued that archaeologists need to move away from the nation as this is a new construct and study the continuity of influence across different indigenous peoples in the horn of Africa, proposing regional perspective on the archaeology of the Horn of Africa.

Mire is considered to have pioneered the study of indigenous heritage management systems in Africa with her article "Preserving knowledge, not objects: a Somali perspective for Archaeological Research and Heritage Management" (African Archaeological Review, 2007). She addressed the looting and destruction of Somalia's heritage after the start of the Somali civil war. She advanced a theoretical approach she terms "the Knowledge-Centered Approach" arguing that objects and monuments are not necessarily important but knowledge, skill and memory as practiced and symbolized in the landscapes. Her approaches have been discussed by other scholars in the application of locally appropriate theoretical frameworks.

Other activities 
In 2011, Mire proposed to UNESCO the digital preservation of Somali potential World Heritage. She's a speaker of the first UNESCO Debate organized by UNESCO Netherlands at the RMO, September 2016. Mire spoke along Dutch philosopher Stephan Sanders.

Mire has spoken on several BBC Radio programs including BBC World Service Forum panel on the Aftermath of war and marriage.

She was a speaker at the Europe Lecture and an "eminent" respondent to UNESCO Director General Irina Bokova, June 2016.

In September 2018, Mire participated to Hague Talks "How can we Invest in Sustainable Peace?"

Mire was a speaker at the Swedish National Heritage Board

Mire on BBC World Service radio documentary "Stories on the Rocks", December 2018.

Awards and honors 
In April 2017, Mire was selected for the Hay Festival of Literature and the Arts' 30 international thinkers and writers.

In 2016, Mire was included a list of 12 pioneer women archaeologists who have contributed to the enrichment of the discipline throughout history.

Mire is on the boards of several notable institutions, including the Prince Claus Foundation.

Filmography 
CNN made a feature documentary on the story of Mire and her twin sister Sohur. The CNN African Voices Program featured the sisters in their professional environment, as an archeologist and a medical doctor giving back to their community and working in their homeland, Somalia. The documentary discusses how they fled the Somali civil war and started new lives in Sweden as child refugees.

For National Geographic's Don't Tell my Mother I'm in Somalia episode, presenter Diego Buñuel met up with Mire in her office in Hargeisa and with her visited some of the landmarks of Somaliland.

Brazil's Futura (TV Channel) aired in 2014 a documentary titled Sada and Somaliland, following her progress as the country's only Somali archeologist.

Mire was one of the experts featuring in the 2017 PBS series Africa's Great Civilizations, presented by Professor Henry Louis Gates Jr.

Mire is the presenter and screenwriter of the MOOC titled Heritage under Threat.

Selected publications

Articles
 "Somali Shield, Gaashaan". Hazina. 2006.
 "The Transition to Farming in Eastern Africa: New Faunal and Dating Evidence from Wadh Lang’o and Usenge, Kenya". Antiquity. 2007.
 "Preserving Knowledge, not Objects: A Somali Perspective for Heritage Management and Archaeological Research". African Archaeological Review. 2007.
 "The Discovery of Dhambalin Rock Art Site, Somaliland". African Archaeological Review. 2008.
 "The Knowledge-Centred Approach to the Somali Cultural Emergency and heritage development assistance in Somaliland". African Archaeological Review. 2011.
 "Beautiful Somali buildings are rising up in a former war zone. It gives me hope". The Guardian. 2015.
 "Wagar, Fertility and Phallic Stelae: Cushitic Sky-God Belief and the Site of Saint Aw-Barkhadle in Somaliland". African Archaeological Review. 2015.
 "Mapping the Archaeology of Somaliland: Religion, Art, Script, Time, Urbanism, Trade and Empire". African Archaeological Review. 2015.
 "Tourism of Somalia. 2015".
 "‘The child that tiire doesn't give you, God won't give you either.’ The role of Rotheca myricoides in Somali fertility practices". In: Anthropology & Medicine, 2016, 23: 3, p.311-331.
 "The Role of Cultural Heritage in the Basic Needs of East African Pastoralists". African Study Monographs 53(Supplementary Issue): 147-157.
 "Black history has much to reveal about our ancestors – and ourselves". The Guardian. 2018.

References

External links 
 
 Europe lecture on cultural heritage
 Reflections by Sada Mire
 Mire TEDxEuston Cultural heritage: a basic human need - Sada Mire at TEDxEuston

Somalian archaeologists
Living people
1977 births
People from Hargeisa
Lund University alumni
Alumni of the UCL Institute of Archaeology
Academic staff of Leiden University
Somalian women archaeologists